Yanqing Temple is a Buddhist temple located  to the west of Wutai County, Shanxi, China.

History
The Yanqing temple was founded during the Jin dynasty, and its Great Hall also dates from that period. The interior of the Great Hall has no pillars; it supports itself using the brackets of two rafters.

Notes

References
Qin Xuhua, ed. Dudong Wutaishan. Taiyuan: Shanxi People's Press, 2004.

Buddhist temples in Xinzhou
Jin dynasty (1115–1234) architecture
Major National Historical and Cultural Sites in Shanxi

External links
Yanqing Monastery, Architectura Sinica Site Archive